Pietro Riva (born 1 May 1997) is an Italian long-distance runner who was 5th in 10,000 m at the 2022 European Athletics Championships.

Achievements

National titles
Riva won three national championships at individual senior level.

Italian Athletics Championships
5000 m: 2021
10,000 m: 2022
Italian 10 km road Championship
10 km road: 2022

References

External links
 

1997 births
Living people
Italian male long-distance runners
Athletics competitors of Fiamme Oro